Streptomyces rubiginosohelvolus is a bacterium species from the genus of Streptomyces which has been isolated from soil.

See also 
 List of Streptomyces species

References

Further reading

External links
Type strain of Streptomyces rubiginosohelvolus at BacDive -  the Bacterial Diversity Metadatabase	

rubiginosohelvolus
Bacteria described in 1958